Richard Lambart may refer to:

Richard Lambart, 2nd Earl of Cavan (1628–1691), Member of Parliament for Kilbeggan 
Richard Lambart, 4th Earl of Cavan (died 1742), Irish peer
Richard Lambart, 6th Earl of Cavan (died 1778), Anglo-Irish peer and soldier
Richard Lambart, 7th Earl of Cavan (1763 – 1837), British military commander throughout the Napoleonic era and beyond

See also
Richard Lambert (disambiguation)